Igor Muttik (born 1962 in Russia) is a computer security expert, researcher and inventor.

Career
Igor Muttik is a Senior Principal Research Architect with McAfee which is part of Intel Corporation since 2011. He started researching computer malware in 1980s when anti-virus industry was in its infancy. Muttik holds a PhD degree in physics and mathematics from the Moscow State University. He has been a member of CARO (Computer Antivirus Research Organization) since 1994, and worked as a virus researcher for Dr. Solomon’s Software. Since 1998 Muttik was running McAfee’s anti-malware research in EMEA and switched to his architectural role in 2002.

In 2008 he was one of the co-founders of AMTSO (Anti-Malware Testing Standards Organization) and was on the Board of AMTSO for 3 years. Muttik was also a co-founder of Industry Connections Security Group (ICSG is part of IEEE) - he is the chair of the taggant system working group, vice-chair of the ICSG and CMX (clean file metadata exchange) working groups. The taggant system and CMX are both part of AMSS (Anti-Malware Support Service).

He is a regular speaker at major international security conferences like Black Hat Briefings, RSA Conference, DEF CON, Virus Bulletin, EICAR. Muttik lives in the UK

Muttik is a visiting professor at the Information Security Group at Royal Holloway, University of London. He is heading McAfee's work for the security research of mobile devices funded by EPSRC: MobSec, ACID and AppGuarden  projects. His current work is focused on the architecture of security solutions for smart devices and on hardware-assisted security technologies.

Packer controversy
In May 2009 Muttik's blog about the risks associated with the use of software packers caused criticism by Rob Rosenberger. Despite this incident Muttik is working closely today with several software companies developing software packers (like Themida) on the taggant system.

See also
 Antivirus software
 Dr Solomon's Antivirus
 CARO
 EICAR

References

External links
 Issued USPTO patents
 AMTSO resources
 Virus Bulletin resources
 Muttik's publications (covering research in solid state physics, anti-malware and in security industry collaboration)
 Personal Web page

Living people
1962 births
Russian computer scientists
Computer security specialists